Sayyid Mohammad-Reza Mirtajodini (born on 30 December 1960) is an Iranian cleric and conservative politician. He was Vice President for parliamentary affairs from 2009 to 2013 and a member of the parliament from 2004 to 2009. He was also an adviser of President Mahmoud Ahmadinejad in clerics subjects.

References

1960 births
Living people
People from Tabriz
Deputies of Tabriz, Osku and Azarshahr
Vice Presidents of Iran for Parliamentary Affairs
Members of the 7th Islamic Consultative Assembly
Members of the 8th Islamic Consultative Assembly
University of Tabriz alumni